Sam Davis (born 1964 in New York City, New York) is a German-American film producer. He is the founder of Germany-based production company Rowboat Film- und Fernsehproduktion, and lives and works in Cologne.

Life 
Davis is a graduate of the University of Southern California and studied German at UCLA. After working at 20th Century Fox, he founded his own company Insight Out Films. In 1992, Davis moved to Frankfurt (Germany), where he wrote and directed the documentary ”Warum wir hier sind“ (“Why we´re here”) for the BBC and WDR. From 1993 until 1998, he was head of the TV Movie Department at RTL Television in Cologne. During this time, he was responsible for the development and production of approximately 100 TV movies and miniseries. He introduced Germany to the made-for-TV movie.

In 1998, Davis became a partner and Co-CEO of Cologne-based production company Zeitsprung. He produced event productions, TV movies and series.

From 2004 until 2009, Davis took charge of the German Fiction department of Endemol Germany where he was responsible for TV movie and series productions "Liebe ohne Rückfahrschein", "Mr. Nanny - Ein Mann für Mama" and the two-part "London, Liebe, Taubenschlag".

In January 2010, Davis co-founded and became CEO of Rowboat Film- und Fernsehproduktion. Rowboat's first TV movie A Day for a Miracle premiered at the Hamburg Film Festival in 2011. In 2012 Davis won the ROMY prize in Austria for Best Producer for A Day for a Miracle. At the International Emmy Award 2013 A Day for a Miracle won in the category TV Movie/Mini-Series. Since then Davis has produced Murder by the Lake and Professor T and Faster Than Fear.

Davis is married and has four children.

Awards and nominations 
 2012: ROMY, Best TV Producer for A Day for a Miracle At the International Emmy Award 2013 A Day for a Miracle won in the category TV Movie/Mini-Series.
 2013: International Emmy Award, Best TV Movie/Miniseries for A Day for a Miracle
 2014: Hamburg Producers Award, Nominated for Best German Television Film for The cold Truth
 2015: Hamburg Producers Award, Nominated for Best German Television Film for Trust me
 2019: Hamburg Producers Award, Nominated for Best German Television Film for Skin and Bones
 2021: Hamburg Producers Award, Nominated for Best German Television Film for Take me Home
 2021: Hamburg Producers Award, Nominated for Best German Television Series for Faster Than Fear
 2022: German Television Award, Nomintaed for Best Miniseries for Faster than Fear 
 2022: Seoul International Drama Awards, Best TV Movie for Take me Home

Filmography 

 1993: Tödliche Lüge
 1993: Das Schicksal der Lilian H.
 1994: Eine Mutter kämpft um ihren Sohn
 1994: Weihnachten mit Willy Wuff
 1994: 
 1994: Mein Kind soll leben
 1994: Das ist dein Ende
 1994: Blut an der Wiege
 1995: Tödliches Leben
 1995: Der Räuber mit der sanften Hand
 1995: Mörderische Zwillinge
 1995: Mit verbundenen Augen
 1995: Anwalt Martin Berg – Im Auftrag der Gerechtigkeit: Mord im Klinikum
 1995: Alle lieben Willy Wuff
 1996: 
 1996: Zwei Leben hat die Liebe
 1996: 
 1996: Die Stimme des Mörders
 1996: Ein sauberer Mord: Tod in der Reinigungsfirma
 1996: Der Parkhausmörder
 1996: Child Murder
 1996: 
 1996: Adrenalin
 1996: 5 Stunden Angst – Geiselnahme im Kindergarten
 1997: Frucht der Gewalt
 1997: Sexy Lissy
 1997: Das verflixte Babyjahr – Nie wieder Sex?
 1997: Der Todesbus
 1997: Tod eines Lehrers – Eine Schule unter Verdacht
 1997: Thalia – Königin der Liebe
 1997: Sünde einer Nacht
 1997: Nina – vom Kinderzimmer in Bordell
 1997: Mörderischer wohnen – Der Tod des letzten Mieters
 1997: Die Lüge in deinen Augen
 1997: Kalte Küsse
 1997: Geisterstunde – Fahrstuhl ins Jenseits
 1997: Die Friseuse und der Millionär
 1997: Ferkel Fritz
 1997: Blutige Scheidung
 1997: Der stille Herr Genardy
 1997: Die Mädchenfalle – Der Tod kommt online
 1997: Sieben Feuer des Todes – Code Red
 1998: Vickys Albtraum
 1998: Silvias Bauch – Zwei Männer und (k)ein Baby
 1998: Sieben Tage bis zum Glück
 1998: Meine Frau liebt zwei
 1998: Florian – Liebe aus ganzem Herzen
 1998: Liebe mich bis in den Tod
 1998: Höllische Nachbarn
 1998: Herzbeben – Die Nacht, die alles änderte
 1998: Die heilige Hure
 1998: Gigolo – Bei Anruf Liebe
 1998: Du hast mir meine Familie geraubt
 1998: Das Callgirl
 1998: The Beast in the Lake
 1998: Zerschmetterte Träume – Eine Liebe in Fesseln
 1998: Das Miststück
 1998: Florian – Liebe aus ganzem Herzen
 1999: Die Singlefalle – Liebesspiele bis in den Tod
 1999: Paul und Clara – Liebe vergeht nie
 2000: Liebe pur
 2000: Anna H. – Geliebte, Ehefrau und Hure
 2000: Laila – Unsterblich verliebt
 2001: Mircomania
 2001: Todeslust
 2001: Die Frau, die Freundin und der Vergewaltiger
 2001: 
 2001: Pest – Die Rückkehr
 2001: Die heimlichen Blicke des Mörders
 2001: Kleiner Mann sucht großes Herz
 2002: Zwei Affären und eine Hochzeit
 2002: Flitterwochen im Treppenhaus
 2002: Traumprinz in Farbe
 2003: 
 2003: Krista
 2004: Liebe ohne Rückfahrschein
 2005: Brautpaar auf Probe
 2005: Ein Hund, zwei Koffer und die ganz große Liebe
 2005: Eine Prinzessin zum Verlieben
 2006: Maja Paradies
 2006: Meine bezaubernde Feindin
 2006: Mr. Nanny – ein Mann für Mama
 2006: Zwei Bräute und eine Affäre
 2007: Der geheimnisvolle Schwiegersohn
 2008: Kleine Lüge für die Liebe
 2008: Vier Tage Toskana
 2008: Zoogeflüster – Komm mir nicht ins Gehege!
 2009: 40+ sucht neue Liebe
2009: London, Liebe, Taubenschlag
 2009: London, Liebe, Taubenschlag: Klapprad oder Klapperstorch
2011: A Day for a Miracle (Director: Andreas Prochaska)
 2011: Summer in Alsace (Director: Michael Keusch)
 2012: The End of Lies (Director: Marcus O.Rosenmüller)
 2014: On the Road with Elsa (Director: Bettine Woernle)
2013: Summer in Portugal (Director: Michael Keusch)
2013: The Homecoming (Director: Olaf Kreinsen)
 2013: Murder by the Lake - The Celtic Mystery (Director: Andreas Linke)
 2014: The Cold Truth (Director: Franziska Meletzky)
 2014: Murder by the Lake 2 - Family Issues (Director: Andreas Linke)
 2015: Trust me (Director: Franziska Meletzky)
 2015: Because I Love You ... (Director: Christina Schiewe)
 2015: Murder by the Lake 3 - The Sleepwalker (Director: Andreas Linke)
 2016: Murder by the Lake 4 - Till Death do them part (Director: Hannu Salonen)
 2016: Murder by the Lake 5 - The Girl who loved to laugh (Director: Hannu Salonen)
2016: Professor T (series) Season 1 (Director: Thomas Jahn)
 2016: Wedding in Rome (Director: Olaf Kreinsen)
 2017: Murder by the Lake 6 - The Return (Director: Hannu Salonen)
 2017: Murder by the Lake 7 - The fourth Woman (Director: Hannu Salonen)
 2017: Professor T (series) Season 2 (Director: Thomas Jahn)
 2018: Murder by the Lake 8 - Death in the Forest (Director: Michael Schneider)
 2018: Murder by the Lake 9 - Mermaid (Director: Michael Schneider)
 2018: Professor T (series) Season 3 (Director: Thomas Jahn)
 2019: Skin and Bones (Director: Christina Schiewe)
 2019: Murder by the Lake 10 - Curse from the depths (Director: Michael Schneider)
 2019: Murder by the Lake 11 - Blood Procession (Director: Michael Schneider)
 2019: Professor T (series) Season 4 (Director: Thomas Jahn)
 2020: Take me Home (Director: Christiane Balthasar)
2021: Murder by the Lake 12 - Haunted (Director: Michael Schneider)
2021: Murder by the Lake 13 - Soul Circle (Director: Michael Schneider)
2021: Murder Squared (Director: Michael Schneider) 
2021: Faster than Fear (Director: Florian Baxmeyer)
2022: Jeanny - the fifth Girl (Director: Andreas Kopriva)

Publications 
In 2000, Davis book' Quotenfieber - Das Geheimnis erfolgreicher TV-Movies was published. In this book, he writes about the German television broadcasting business, how fictional TV-movies are made, what functions they have and the importance of ratings.

References

External links 
 Sam Davis on IMDb
 Sam Davis on Crew United

American emigrants to Germany
American film producers
University of Southern California alumni
University of California, Los Angeles alumni
Living people
1964 births